The 1896 Vermont gubernatorial election took place on September 1, 1896. Incumbent Republican Urban A. Woodbury, per the "Mountain Rule", did not run for re-election to a second term as Governor of Vermont. Republican candidate Josiah Grout defeated Democratic candidate J. Henry Jackson to succeed him.

Results

References

Vermont
1896
Gubernatorial
September 1896 events